The 2018 Sydney Sevens was the third tournament within the 2017–18 World Rugby Sevens Series and the fifteenth edition of the Australia Sevens, of which the third to be held in Sydney. It was held over the weekend of 26–28 January 2018 at Allianz Stadium in Sydney, Australia.

Format
The teams were drawn into four pools of four teams each, with each team playing every other team in their pool once. The top two teams from each pool advanced to the Cup/5th place brackets. The bottom two teams from each group went to the Challenge trophy/13th place brackets.

Teams
Fifteen core teams are participating in the tournament along with one invited team, the highest-placing non-core team of the 2017 Oceania Sevens Championship, Papua New Guinea:

Pool stage
All times in Australian Eastern Daylight Time (UTC+11:00)

Pool A

Pool B

Pool C

Pool D

Knockout stage

13th place

Challenge Trophy

5th place

Cup

Tournament placings

Source: World Rugby

Players

Scoring leaders

Source: World Rugby

Dream Team
The following seven players were selected to the tournament Dream Team at the conclusion of the tournament:

See also
 2018 Sydney Women's Sevens

References

External links
Tournament Page

2018
2017–18 World Rugby Sevens Series
2018 in Australian rugby union
2018
January 2018 sports events in Australia